Stilwell is a city and county seat of Adair County, Oklahoma, United States.  The population was 3,700 as of the 2020 U.S. census, a decline of 6.7 percent from the 3,949 population recorded in 2010. The Oklahoma governor and legislature proclaimed Stilwell as the "Strawberry Capital of the World” in 1949, but the role of strawberries in the local economy has diminished significantly since then. Today, residents of Stilwell are among the poorest and most impoverished in the United States. Stilwell also serves as a gateway to Lake Tenkiller and Adair Park, formerly called Adair State Park before it was defunded.

History
Stilwell's history began in 1838 as an end point of the Trail of Tears when the U.S. federal government forcibly relocated thousands of Indigenous people to the area. The event was called nu na da ul tsun yi in Cherokee language, or "the place where they cried". The U.S. federal government set up a “disbandment depot” outside what is present-day Stilwell in the early months of 1839 to distribute food and supplies to the newly arrived Indigenous people. Those with resources quickly left to settle across the rest of Indian Territory, but the sickest and poorest stayed in the Stilwell area, close to the safety of the depot.

The Kansas City Southern Railway built a rail line through what is present-day Stilwell in 1896. The municipality developed because of the rail line and was incorporated as a town on January 2, 1897. The town was named after Arthur Stilwell, noted philanthropist and founder of the Kansas City Southern Railway.

As early as 1901, Stilwell and Westville vied for the role of county seat. When Adair County was formed in 1907, Westville was identified as the county seat, due partly to its location at the intersection of two major railroads: the Kansas City Southern Railway and the St. Louis–San Francisco Railway. After three intensely contested elections, however, Oklahoma governor Charles Haskell proclaimed Stilwell as the county seat on May 6, 1910.

Stilwell was served by Kansas City Southern's Southern Belle passenger rail line until November 2, 1969. The rail line connected Stilwell with daily trains to New Orleans and Kansas City, with stops in Northwest Arkansas, Joplin, Shreveport, Baton Rouge and many other cities in-between. A second line, The Flying Crow, also stopped in the town. The town's train station fell into disrepair due to vandalism and was closed on February 22, 1971. The station building itself was restored in 2004 though passenger rail service was not. During the Great Depression and World War II, strawberries emerged a major crop and cornerstone of the local economy. In 1948, a strawberry festival was organized, and in 1949, the state governor and legislature proclaimed Stilwell as "Strawberry Capital of the World." Stilwell's strawberry festival became an annual event. Over time, the strawberry industry weakened, cultivated acreage decreased and the role of strawberries in the local economy dissipated. Despite this, Stilwell still holds a strawberry festival annually and the town's 2015 festival had approximately 30,000 people in attendance. Stilwell’s 2022 strawberry festival featured the largest parade in its 75 year history with over 100 floats.

Geography

Stilwell is located at  (35.815234, -94.631359). Stilwell is at the intersection of U.S. Highway 59 and State Highway 51. Sallisaw and Little Lee creeks are nearby.

Earthquakes are often felt in Stilwell due to oil and gas production activities in central Oklahoma. 

According to Jennifer Patterson, Oklahoma State University Adair County Extension Director, Stilwell is good for growing strawberries because of its rocky, acidic soil and good drainage. Below the ground in Stilwell lays chert rock, which breaks down into the soil and purportedly gives strawberries a unique taste.

Demographics

As of the 2020 U.S. census, there were 3,700 people residing in the city. The population of Stilwell is declining. The ethnic makeup of the Stilwell is 48.41% Indigenous, 41.88% White, 0.49% African American, 0.21% Asian, 0.03% Pacific Islander, 3.45% from other races, and 5.53% from two or more races. Hispanic or Latino residents representing any race are 6.99% of the population.

There were 1,269 households, out of which 35.5% had children under the age of 18 living with them, 42.7% were married couples living together, 17.6% had a female householder with no partner present, and 36.2% were non-families. 33.1% of all households were made up of individuals, and 15.7% had someone living alone who was 65 years of age or older. The average household size was 2.49 and the average family size was 3.21.

In the city, the population was spread out, with 30.0% under the age of 18, 10.8% from 18 to 24, 26.9% from 25 to 44, 17.5% from 45 to 64, and 14.9% who were 65 years of age or older. The median age was 32 years. For every 100 females, there were 86.1 males. For every 100 females age 18 and over, there were 79.6 males. The population density was 1,033.7 people per square mile (399.0/km). There were 1,434 housing units at an average density of 452.5 per square mile (174.7/km).

Economy
Stilwell's economy is characterized by high rates of poverty, low incomes and a low standard of living. Residents of Stilwell are among the poorest and most impoverished in the United States.

The per capita income for Stilwell is $12,872 per year, and median household income is $31,637 per year, as of 2017. As of 2017, 37.2% of adults and 49.0% of children in Stilwell are living below the poverty line. Poverty in the town is increasing and 50.4% of residents do not have an internet subscription.

Agriculture has been the mainstay of the local economy for a century. Strawberry farming was particularly successful during the Great Depression and World War II. At its peak, the town had about 2,000 acres of farmland devoted to strawberries. Over time, the role of strawberries diminished significantly and only seven strawberry farms remained as of 2022. Ranching became important around 1960 and the town's local industries were largely an outgrowth of agriculture. Employers included Tyson Foods, the Stilwell Canning Company and its successor, Mrs. Smith's Bakery/Stilwell Foods, Cherokee Nation Industries, and Facet Industries. As of 2022, the minimum wage in Stilwell is $7.25 per hour. For full-time students, tipped employees, farm workers, seasonal workers and people with disabilities, the minimum wage is $2.13 per hour.

Health

Scientists have suggested Stilwell's environment may be contaminated with unsafe levels of mercury, and as of 2021, studies are ongoing. Rainfall samples collected over a 13-year span at an air quality station near Stilwell found abnormally high levels of mercury. The study found an annual average mercury concentration of nearly 11 ng/L, about one and a half times higher than the national average. The Oklahoma Department of Environmental Quality warned residents against eating certain fish from Stilwell's city lake in 2019, furthering suspicion that the town's aquifer could be contaminated.

Stilwell was labelled "the early death capital of the world" after a detailed report by the National Center for Health Statistics surfaced in 2018 indicating the life expectancy of the town's residents was just 56.3 years. The agency stated the report was their "most detailed local health data ever released" and the life expectancy of Stilwell residents was lower than that in every jurisdiction in North America, Europe or Asia, with a similar life-expectancy to the poorest regions of sub-Saharan Africa. The Cherokee Nation disputed the report initially before further studies were done, stating the data "has to be flawed.” In February 2020, the Centers for Disease Control and Prevention stated they would soon release their own report increasing the town's life expectancy figure to 74 years. The CDC stated that the National Center for Health Statistics report was "flawed" because 90 deceased individuals with P.O. box addresses in Stilwell that lived outside city limits were included in the report, producing inaccurate data. Despite the correction, Stilwell's Roberts Reed Culver Funeral Home reports half of all funerals performed in 2018 were for people in their 50's and 60's.

16% of adults in Stilwell have diabetes, 27% smoke, and 42% are obese, according to the Oklahoma State University Center for Health Sciences. Health services include the Cherokee Nation Wilma Mankiller Health Clinic, the Stilwell Memorial Hospital, the Oklahoma Department of Public Health, and the Stilwell Nursing Home. According to the Census Bureau, 28.5% of all residents, and 60% of those in Stilwell who are unemployed do not have health insurance.

Stilwell city council passed a mask mandate in response to the COVID-19 pandemic on July 8, 2020, taking advice from a local infectious disease specialist. Just 10 days later, city council struck down the mandate advising face masks would no longer required after receiving "extremely hostile" responses and threats against officials.

Education

Stilwell Public Schools provides education for children from kindergarten through twelfth grade. There is one elementary school, one middle school and one high school. Technical and vocational studies beyond high school level are offered by the Indian Capital Technology Center campus in Stilwell.

Stilwell was briefly served by the Flaming Rainbow University, a private, baccalaureate university between 1971 - 1989. Despite being dubbed a "non-traditional university", it obtained accreditation from the Oklahoma State Regents for Higher Education in 1974 and was accredited by the North Central Association of Colleges and Schools. According to its founder, David Hilligoss, the school was created to "Provide an education to Isolated Indians and rural whites in this beautifully treed and poverty stricken section of the state". The Flaming Rainbow University was named in honor of a Sioux medicine man's vision, which featured a rainbow symbolizing knowledge and its power. The university lost all accreditation in 1989 and closed.

Government
Stilwell has a mayor-council form of government, with five members on the city council. City departments reporting to the mayor include the police department, volunteer fire department, sewer and garbage service, natural gas and electric service. As of 2021, the mayor of Stilwell is Jean Ann Wright. She was elected in 2019 and is the first Indigenous woman to hold the office.

The town has voted staunchly Republican for over 45 years. 77.5% of voters in Stilwell voted for Donald Trump in the 2020 U.S. presidential election.

After being de-funded and closed by the Oklahoma state government, Adair Park in Stilwell has since been acquired by the county government. The municipal government bans the sale of alcohol on Sundays, in addition to 7 holidays per year.

Crime
Stilwell has one of the highest crime rates in America, compared to communities of all sizes. The crime rate in Stilwell is 122% higher than the national average, and 71% higher than the state average. Violent crime has increased every year since 2009 and Stilwell has an incarceration rate higher than what's found in every other country in the world. The murder rate in Stilwell is 10 per 100,000 people, double the national average. In response to the town's high crime rate, Stilwell has a year-round curfew in place that prohibits people under the age of 18 from being in public past midnight.

Three bombs were detonated in Stilwell on January 23, 2012. The Federal Bureau of Investigation (FBI), Bureau of Alcohol, Tobacco, Firearms and Explosives (ATF), Oklahoma Highway Patrol, Adair County Sheriffs, and Stilwell city police investigated the explosions. The investigation concluded the explosions were intentional and were caused by pipe bombs.

Approximately 12 miles (19.3 km) southeast of Stilwell is Elohim City, an armed, evangelical, white supremacist compound with alleged ties to the Oklahoma City Bombing. The enclave has ties to myriad criminal, terror and racist organizations, including the Aryan Resistance Movement. An Associated Press investigation from 2003 concluded that white supremacists from Elohim City played a “major role” in the bombing of the Alfred P. Murrah Federal Building that killed 168 people. The Southern Poverty Law Center calls the compound “the meeting ground for America’s most sinister extremists”.

Infrastructure

Transportation

Airports
Painting Planes Airport is the primary general aviation airport for Stilwell. It has a single 1,084 foot (330 m) runway and is located three miles (4.8 km) southwest of the town. The airport is in poor condition and lacks basic facilities such as a wind cone. The runway's numbers and markings are faded and its surface is in disrepair with many cracks. The closest commercial service airport is Northwest Arkansas National Airport (often referred to by its IATA airport code, XNA) and is located 51 miles (82 km) northwest of Stilwell, out of state.

Highways 
Stilwell sits at the confluence of two highways, U.S. Highway 59 and Oklahoma State Highway 51.

Pedestrian and cycling
There are minimal pedestrian facilities in Stilwell. Almost all city streets do not have sidewalks, aside from a few of the oldest streets in the downtown area. Many of these sidewalks are in disrepair. There are no paved pathways outside parks and there is no cycling infrastructure in the town. Almost all errands require an automobile, according to Walk Score, an online, independently calculated walkability index that, based on a number of metrics, provides a score on how walkable an area is.

Public transportation
There is a limited on-demand transit service in the town, privately operated by the KI BOIS Area Transit System. Though the service is open to the public, it is not widely used and its primary purpose is to provide low-cost rides to disadvantaged, elderly and impoverished Stilwell residents. There are no fixed bus routes, intercity buses or passenger rail services in Stilwell.

Railways
Stilwell is situated on the Kansas City Southern (KCS) main line, it runs north and south through the east end of the town.

NRHP Sites

Sites in Stilwell listed on the National Register of Historic Places include:

 The Adair County Courthouse, on Division Street
 Golda's Mill; the ruins are 12 miles northwest 
 The KCS Railway Depot, off US Route 59

Notable people
 Samuel Mayes, principal Chief of the Cherokee Nation in Indian Territory (present-day Oklahoma), serving from 1895 to 1899.
 Wilma Mankiller, the first female principal chief of the Cherokee Nation.
 Sam Claphan, Cherokee, former football player for the Oklahoma Sooners and San Diego Chargers of the NFL.
 Markwayne Mullin, Republican U.S. representative for Oklahoma's 2nd congressional district and multimillionaire.

See also
 Cookson Hills
 Strawberry Festival

References

External links

 

Cities in Adair County, Oklahoma
Cities in Oklahoma
County seats in Oklahoma
Cherokee towns in Oklahoma
Populated places established in 1897